Aloeides pallida, the giant copper, is a butterfly of the family Lycaenidae. It is found in South Africa.

The wingspan is 30–39 mm for males and 34–45 mm females. Adults are on wing from October to early January or as early as August for the nominate subspecies. There is one generation per year.

The larvae of subspecies A. p. pallida and A. p. jonathani feed on Aspalathus species. The larvae of subspecies A. p. grandis are fed by trophallaxis by Lepisiota capensis ants. They also feed on the eggs of these ants.

Subspecies
A. p. pallida (Western Cape to Eastern Cape and north to the Free State)
A. p. grandis Tite & Dickson, 1968 (mountains above Paarl and Franschhoek north to Gydo Mountain and east to Garcia's Pass)
A. p. littoralis Tite & Dickson, 1968 (coastal fynbos from Hermanus to Knysna in the Western Cape)
A. p. jonathani Pringle, 1987 (montane fynbos in the Kammanassie Mountains in the Western Cape)
A. p. juno Pringle, 1994 (fynbos in the Eastern Cape)
A. p. liversidgei Pringle, 1994 (Baviaanskloof Mountains in the Eastern Cape)

References

Butterflies described in 1968
Aloeides
Endemic butterflies of South Africa